Ian McDiarmid (born 11 August 1944) is a Scottish actor and director of stage and screen, best known for portraying the Sith Lord Darth Sidious in the Star Wars multimedia franchise. Making his stage debut in Hamlet in 1972, McDiarmid joined the Royal Shakespeare Company in 1974, and has since starred in a number of Shakespeare's plays. He has received an Olivier Award for Best Actor and a Tony Award for Best Featured Actor in a Play for his stage performances.

Early life
McDiarmid was born in Carnoustie, Angus, Scotland, on 11 August 1944. He became a theatre aficionado when he was five years old, when his father took him to see an act named Tommy Morgan at a theatre in Dundee. In 2004, he stated, "It sort of fascinated me, and it also scared me. All those lights, all that make-up. I said to myself, 'I don't know what this is, but I want it.'"

However, fearing his father's disapproval, McDiarmid attended Queen's College, Dundee (now the University of Dundee, but then a constituent part of the University of St Andrews), where he received a Master of Arts in psychology. Soon after, he decided to pursue a career in the theatre instead, and took acting training courses at the Royal Scottish Academy of Music and Drama in Glasgow.

In 1968, McDiarmid received a gold medal for his work from the Royal Scottish Academy of Music and Drama, the first of many recognitions given to him for his work in the theatre. McDiarmid claimed he became its recipient "by doing all the boring jobs you have to do when you are young, to eke out an existence."

Career

Theatre
McDiarmid has worked as an actor and director in British theatre. He has starred in several Shakespeare plays, including Hamlet (1972), The Tempest (1974, 2000), Much Ado About Nothing (1976), Trevor Nunn's 1976 Macbeth (television 1978), The Merchant of Venice (1984), and King Lear (2005). He played Ivanov in Tom Stoppard's play Every Good Boy Deserves Favour at the Mermaid Theatre in 1978.

From 1990, McDiarmid and Jonathan Kent served as the artistic directors of the Almeida Theatre in Islington, London, gaining the commitment of prominent actresses such as Glenda Jackson and Claire Bloom for their productions. The two men resigned in 2001 with the venue in good shape. Their tenure was marked by a string of highly successful performances involving actors such as Kevin Spacey and Ralph Fiennes. While connected with the Almeida, McDiarmid directed plays such as Venice Preserv'd (1986) and Hippolytus (1991). In 2002, McDiarmid won Almeida Theatre's Critic's Circle Award for Best Actor for his role as Teddy in a revival of Brian Friel's Faith Healer. Five years later in 2006, he reprised this role in his debut on Broadway. Directed by Kent, he performed alongside Ralph Fiennes and Cherry Jones, and won the Tony Award for Best Performance by a Featured Actor in a Play. From April to June 2012, he played the title role in Timon of Athens at Chicago Shakespeare Theater.

He portrayed Harry Hackamore in Sam Shepard's play Seduced. McDiarmid described Hackamore as a Howard Hughes-type character. To play the part, he was made up in prosthetics, including a false beard and long fingernails. McDiarmid was only 37 at the time, and this convinced George Lucas and Richard Marquand that he could convincingly play a much older character in extreme cinematic close-up, which helped him land the role of Palpatine.

Star Wars

After a minor part in the film Dragonslayer (1981), McDiarmid was cast by George Lucas in Return of the Jedi (1983) as the Emperor, the film's villain. CNN named McDiarmid fourth in their top 10 British villains, stating it was his "darkly seductive voice" that "stole the show", and it was a "masterclass in ruling through fear and manipulation." Sixteen years after Return of the Jedi, he reprised the role as the character's younger incarnation of Senator (and later Chancellor) Palpatine and Sith Lord Darth Sidious in the prequel films: The Phantom Menace, Attack of the Clones, and Revenge of the Sith. The prequels had him play two faces to his character; he re-created his diabolical interpretation of the Emperor from Return of the Jedi when playing Darth Sidious, the Chancellor's Sith alter ego, but created a pleasant, charming character in Sidious' public persona. McDiarmid returned to the role of Palpatine on screen for the first time since Revenge of the Sith in the 2019 film The Rise of Skywalker, the third film in the sequel trilogy, and the ninth and final episode in the Skywalker saga.

In the 2004 re-release of The Empire Strikes Back, a brief scene between Darth Vader and a hologram of Darth Sidious was updated to include McDiarmid. The Emperor was originally voiced by Clive Revill for that scene, and visually portrayed by Marjorie Eaton. With this addition to The Empire Strikes Back, McDiarmid has now appeared in every live-action film version in which Sidious appears.

He has also worked with the Star Wars expanded universe as the voice of Darth Sidious in the video game adaptations of The Empire Strikes Back and Return of the Jedi: Super Star Wars: The Empire Strikes Back and Super Star Wars: Return of the Jedi. McDiarmid made a small appearance during Celebration Europe. From 23 to 26 August 2012, he attended Celebration VI in Orlando, Florida, and had his own show titled The Phantom Menace: Ian McDiarmid, hosted by James Arnold Taylor, in which he talked about his experience working on Star Wars and how he landed the role of Sidious. McDiarmid also voiced a pig version of Sidious for a promo video on Angry Birds Star Wars II, entitled "Join the Pork Side". McDiarmid appeared as Darth Sidious in the 2022 TV series Obi-Wan Kenobi, in both new scenes and archive material from the prequel trilogy. He also voiced Palpatine/Darth Sidious in Star Wars: The Bad Batch.

Television and radio
McDiarmid took an early role as Mickey Hamilton, a killer intent on avenging the death of his wife and child in The Professionals (Season 2, Episode 13) for London Weekend Television. In 1990, he starred in the Central Independent Television series Inspector Morses episode "Masonic Mysteries" as the psychopathic con man Hugo DeVries. In 1997, McDiarmid played the villain, Ronald Hinks, in the Touching Evil two-part episode "Through the Clouds/The Lost Boys". He played the role of police detective Porfiry Petrovich in the BBC's 2002 adaptation of Fyodor Dostoyevsky's Crime and Punishment. In 2003, McDiarmid took the role of the Stuart statesman Edward Hyde, in the BBC series Charles II: The Power and The Passion.

In 2005, he portrayed Satan in the 41-part BBC Radio 4 drama based on John Milton's Paradise Lost, which was subsequently re-broadcast on BBC 7. Recently, he played the writer and pioneer of policing, Henry Fielding, in the Channel 4 historical drama series City of Vice and Denis Thatcher in 2009's Margaret.

McDiarmid played intelligence chief LeClerc in a 2009 BBC Radio dramatization of John le Carré's The Looking Glass War. In 2014, he played a leading role as British Foreign Secretary Sir Edward Grey in the BBC television drama 37 Days, which is about the diplomatic crisis preceding the First World War. He also had a recurring role on series 2 of Utopia, playing the role of Anton. In September 2016, McDiarmid starred in the audio podcast drama series Akiha Den Den. He played Cuttings, a ham radio buff who picks up a mysterious voice (Joy McAvoy) coming from an abandoned amusement park and Prospero in a BBC Radio 3 "new, environmentally-inflected production of The Tempest to coincide with COP26 in Glasgow", 7 Nov. 2021.

Work in theatre

Stage appearances

 Hamlet, Open Space Theatre, London, 1972
 And They Put Handcuffs on the Flowers, Open Space Theatre, London, 1973
 In the Jungle of Cities, Place Theatre, London, 1973
 Macbeth, Belgrade Theatre, Coventry, England, 1973, then Bankside Globe Theatre, London, 1973
 Measure for Measure, Royal Shakespeare Company, Stratford-on-Avon, England, 1974
 Macbeth, Royal Shakespeare Company, Aldwych Theatre, London, 1975
 Macbeth, Royal Shakespeare Company, Other Place Theatre, Stratford-on-Avon, England, 1976
 Destiny, Royal Shakespeare Company, Other Place Theatre, 1976
 Dingo, Royal Shakespeare Company, Other Place Theatre, 1976
 Schweyk in the Second World War, Royal Shakespeare Company, Other Place Theatre, 1976, then Warehouse Theatre, London, 1977
 Much Ado About Nothing, Royal Shakespeare Company, Royal Shakespeare Theatre, Stratford-on-Avon, 1976, then Aldwych Theatre, 1977
 That Good Between Us, Royal Shakespeare Company, Warehouse Theatre, 1977
 Macbeth, Royal Shakespeare Company, Warehouse Theatre, 1977
 The Days of the Commune, Royal Shakespeare Company, Aldwych Theatre, 1977
 Dingo, Royal Shakespeare Company, Warehouse Theatre, 1978
 Every Good Boy Deserves Favour, Mermaid Theatre, London, 1978
 Peer Gynt by Henrik Ibsen, Oxford Playhouse, 1980
 Mephisto, adapted by Gordon McDougall from the book by Klaus Mann, Oxford Playhouse Company, The Roundhouse Theatre, London, 1981
 The Worlds, New Half Moon Theatre, London, 1981
 Ezra, New Half Moon Theatre, 1981
 Insignificance, Royal Court Theatre, London, 1982
 Tales from Hollywood, National Theatre, 1983
 The Wild Duck by Henrik Ibsen, the Royal Exchange, Manchester, 1983
 The Merchant of Venice, Royal Shakespeare Company, The Pit (Barbican Centre), 1984
 The Party, Royal Shakespeare Company, The Pit (Barbican Centre), London, 1985
 Henry V, Royal Shakespeare Company, Barbican Theatre, London, 1985 (Chorus)
 The War Plays, Royal Shakespeare Company, The Pit (Barbican Centre), 1985
 Crimes in Hot Countries, Royal Shakespeare Company, The Pit (Barbican Centre), 1985
 The Castle, Royal Shakespeare Company, The Pit (Barbican Centre), 1985
 Downchild, Royal Shakespeare Company, The Pit (Barbican Centre), 1985
 Edward II, Royal Exchange Theatre, Manchester, England, 1986
 The Saxon Shore, Almeida Theatre Company, Almeida Theatre, 1986
 Creditors, Almeida Theatre Company, Almeida Theatre, 1986
 The Danton Affair, Royal Shakespeare Company, Barbican Theatre, 1986
 The King Goes Forth to France, Royal Opera, Covent Garden, 1987 (Froissart)
 Don Carlos, Royal Exchange Theatre, 1987 (King Philip)
 The Black Prince, Aldwych Theatre, 1989
 Volpone, Almeida Theatre Company, Almeida Theatre, 1990
 The Rehearsal, Almeida Theatre Company, Almeida Theatre, 1990
 Lulu, Almeida Theatre Company, Almeida Theatre, 1991
 Hippolytus, Almeida Theatre Company, Almeida Theatre, 1991
 The School for Wives, Almeida Theatre Company, Almeida Theatre, 1993
 Hated Nightfall, Royal Exchange Theatre, Manchester, England, 1995
 Tartuffe, Almeida Theatre Company, Almeida Theatre, 1996
 The Government Inspector, Almeida Theatre Company, Almeida Theatre, 1997
 The Doctor's Dilemma, Almeida Theatre Company, Almeida Theatre, 1998
 The Jew of Malta, Almeida Theatre, 1999
 The Tempest, Almeida Theatre, 2000–01
 Faith Healer, Almeida Theatre Company, Almeida Theatre, 2001
 Faith Healer, Gate Theatre in Dublin, 2001–2002
 The Embalmer, Almeida Theatre Company, Almeida Theatre, 2002
 Henry IV, Royal Exchange Theatre, Manchester, England, 2004
 Lear, Sheffield Crucible, 2005
 Faith Healer, Booth Theatre, 2006
 John Gabriel Borkman, Donmar Warehouse, 2007
 Jonah and Otto, Manchester Royal Exchange, 2008
 Be Near Me, National Theatre of Scotland and Donmar Warehouse, 2009
 Six Characters in Search of an Author, Headlong Theatre, 2008–2010
 The Prince of Homburg, Donmar Warehouse, 2010
 Emperor and Galilean, National Theatre, 2011
 The Faith Machine, Royal Court Theatre, 2011
 Timon of Athens, Chicago Shakespeare Theater, 2012
 Life of Galileo, Royal Shakespeare Company, Stratford, 2013
 Merchant of Venice, Almeida, London, 2014
 What Shadows, Birmingham Repertory Theatre, Birmingham, 2016
 The Lemon Table, Salisbury Playhouse, Wiltshire Creative, Sheffield Crucible, Cambridge Arts Theatre, Yvonne Arnaud Theatre, HOME Manchester, Malvern Theatres, 2021

Stage director

 Venice Preserv'd, Almeida Theatre Company, Almeida Theatre, 1986
 Dom Juan, Royal Exchange Theatre, 1988
 The Possibilities, Almeida Theatre Company, Almeida Theatre, 1988
 Scenes from an Execution, Almeida Theatre, 1990
 The Rehearsal, Almeida Theatre Company, Almeida Theatre, 1990
 Volpone, Almeida Theatre Company, Almeida Theatre, 1990
 Lulu, Almeida Theatre Company, Almeida Theatre, 1991
 Hippolytus, Almeida Theatre Company, Almeida Theatre, 1991
 A Hard Heart, Almeida Theatre Company, Almeida Theatre, 1992
 Venice Preserv'd, Almeida Theatre Company, Almeida Theatre, 1995

Filmography

Film

Television

Awards and nominations

References

External links

 
 
 
 
 Bio from the official Star Wars site

1944 births
Alumni of the Royal Conservatoire of Scotland
Alumni of the University of Dundee
Laurence Olivier Award winners
Living people
Royal Shakespeare Company members
Scottish male film actors
Scottish male stage actors
Scottish male television actors
People from Carnoustie
Theatre World Award winners
Tony Award winners
21st-century Scottish male actors
20th-century Scottish male actors
Scottish theatre directors
Scottish male Shakespearean actors
Male actors from Dundee
Scottish atheists